Dwight Van Dorn Peabody (January 26, 1894 – January 3, 1972) was an American football end who played two seasons in the National Football League with the Columbus Panhandles and Toledo Maroons. He played college football at Ohio State University and attended Oberlin High School in Oberlin, Ohio.

References

External links
Just Sports Stats

1894 births
1972 deaths
Players of American football from Ohio
American football ends
Ohio State Buckeyes football players
Columbus Panhandles players
Toledo Maroons players
People from Oberlin, Ohio